Mark Jeremy Bennett (born February 24, 1953) is a United States circuit judge of the United States Court of Appeals for the Ninth Circuit.

Career 
In 1976, Bennett obtained his Bachelor of Arts degree in political science from Union College in Schenectady. He attended Cornell Law School in Ithaca where he sat on the Board of Editors of the Cornell Law Review. There, he received his Juris Doctor in 1979.  After leaving law school, Bennett became a law clerk to Chief Judge Samuel Pailthorpe King of the United States District Court for the District of Hawaii. Completing his clerkship, Bennett served as an Assistant United States Attorney for the District of Columbia from 1980 to 1982 and for the District of Hawaii until 1990. In 1991, Bennett went into private legal practice as a partner at the firm of McCorriston Miller Mukai MacKinnon LLP. At the same time, he worked pro-bono for the attorney general's office and taught at the William S. Richardson School of Law. He served as Attorney General of Hawaii from 2003 to 2010 in the two-term administration of Republican Governor Linda Lingle.

Bennett served as Acting Governor of Hawaii from August 25 to September 3, 2004, upon the absence of Governor Linda Lingle and lieutenant governor Duke Aiona. The executives left the Hawaiian Islands to attend the 2004 Republican National Convention in New York City.

Federal judicial service 
On February 12, 2018, President Donald Trump announced his intent to nominate Bennett to an undetermined seat on the United States Court of Appeals for the Ninth Circuit. On February 15, 2018, his nomination was sent to the Senate. Bennett was nominated for the seat vacated by Judge Richard Clifton, who assumed senior status on December 31, 2016. On April 11, 2018, a hearing on his nomination was held before the Senate Judiciary Committee. On May 10, 2018, his nomination was reported out of committee by an 18–2 vote. On July 9, 2018, the United States Senate voted to invoke cloture by a 72–25 vote. On July 10, 2018, his nomination was confirmed by a 72–27 vote. All 27 votes against his confirmation came from Republican Senators due to his defense of Hawaii's restrictive firearms laws in court. He received his judicial commission on July 13, 2018.

On August 16, 2019, Bennett was in the majority of a split panel for the Ninth Circuit which blocked new asylum restrictions by the Trump administration within its own jurisdiction but declined to block the new asylum rules across the entire nation.

In September 2020, Bennett dissented when the panel majority found that a robocall defendant could not use the Federal Arbitration Act to compel enforcement of a customer agreement the plaintiff had signed years earlier with a separate company that had subsequently been acquired by the holding company that now also owned the defendant.

On December 4, 2021, Bennett was one of two judges who declined to halt San Diego Unified School District's requirements that students be vaccinated by December 20th.

Personal life 
Bennett was born February 24, 1953, in Brooklyn, New York. He is married to Honolulu attorney Patricia Tomi Ohara. He has been a member of the Federalist Society since 2016.

References

External links 
 
 

|-

1953 births
Living people
20th-century American lawyers
21st-century American lawyers
21st-century American judges
Assistant United States Attorneys
Cornell Law School alumni
Federalist Society members
Hawaii Attorneys General
Hawaii lawyers
Hawaii Republicans
Judges of the United States Court of Appeals for the Ninth Circuit
Lawyers from Brooklyn
Union College (New York) alumni
United States court of appeals judges appointed by Donald Trump
University of Hawaiʻi faculty